Memecylon clarkeanum is a species of plant in the family Melastomataceae. It is endemic to Sri Lanka.

References

Endemic flora of Sri Lanka
clarkeanum
Vulnerable plants
Taxonomy articles created by Polbot
Taxa named by Alfred Cogniaux